

350001–350100 

|-id=032
| 350032 Josephhunt ||  || Joseph Hunt (born 1956) is an American engineer and NASA mission manager and flight director who oversaw several missions such as NEOWISE, Spitzer, Cassini–Huygens, and TOPEX/Poseidon. || 
|}

350101–350200 

|-id=178
| 350178 Eisleben ||  || Eisleben, a German town situated in Saxony-Anhalt, where Martin Luther was born and died. || 
|-id=185
| 350185 Linnell ||  || Stuart J. Linnell (born 1947), a noted local musician, poet, songwriter and lifelong friend of Canadian discoverer David D. Balam || 
|}

350201–350300 

|-bgcolor=#f2f2f2
| colspan=4 align=center | 
|}

350301–350400 

|-bgcolor=#f2f2f2
| colspan=4 align=center | 
|}

350401–350500 

|-bgcolor=#f2f2f2
| colspan=4 align=center | 
|}

350501–350600 

|-id=509
| 350509 Vepřoknedlozelo ||  || Vepřoknedlozelo is a famous traditional Czech meal, consisting of roast pork, dumplings and Sauerkraut (cabbage). || 
|}

350601–350700 

|-bgcolor=#f2f2f2
| colspan=4 align=center | 
|}

350701–350800 

|-bgcolor=#f2f2f2
| colspan=4 align=center | 
|}

350801–350900 

|-id=838
| 350838 Gorelysheva ||  || Anna Gorelysheva (1980–2012), a Russian poet and science-fiction writer. || 
|}

350901–351000 

|-id=969
| 350969 Boiohaemum ||  || Boiohaemum (modern day Bohemia, Czech Republic), was the land of the Boii Celtic tribes in Danubian Central Europe around the turn of the Common Era, as mentioned by Strabo and Tacitus. || 
|}

References 

350001-351000